Solariella elegantula is a species of sea snail, a marine gastropod mollusk in the family Solariellidae.

Description
The size of the shell varies between 3.5 mm and 5.5 mm.

Distribution
This marine species occurs in the Gulf of California, Western Mexico to Colombia

References

 W.H. Dall, Illustrations of unfigured types of shells in the collection of the United States National Museum; Proceedings of the United States National Museum v. 66 (1926)

External links
 To Biodiversity Heritage Library (1 publication)
 To USNM Invertebrate Zoology Mollusca Collection
 To ITIS
 To World Register of Marine Species
 

elegantula
Gastropods described in 1925